Kirk Anton Edwards (born 3 November 1984) is a West Indies former international cricketer. He played as a right-handed batsman, domestically mainly for Barbados.

Domestic career
In May 2018, he was selected to play for the Windward Islands national cricket team in the Professional Cricket League draft, ahead of the 2018–19 season. In October 2019, he was named as the captain of the Windward Islands for the 2019–20 Regional Super50 tournament.

International career
Edwards made his Test debut for the West Indies against India at Windsor Park in Dominica in July 2011. He scored 110 runs in the second innings making him the first person to score a Test century at Windsor Park and the 13th West Indies cricketer to score a century on Test debut. In 2008, Edwards coached at Phoenix Cricket Club in Ireland. Edwards played his club cricket in Barbados for Maple Cricket Club, where he led the team in the Twenty20 Club Champions League 2009 tournament in Trinidad. In 2010, Edwards moved to Wanderers Cricket Club.

References

External links
Personal site

1984 births
Barbados cricketers
Living people
Barbadian cricketers
West Indies Test cricketers
West Indies One Day International cricketers
Combined Campuses and Colleges cricketers
Cricketers at the 2011 Cricket World Cup
Cricketers who made a century on Test debut
Barbados Royals cricketers
Jamaica cricketers